Aridane Hernández Umpiérrez (born 23 March 1989), commonly known as just Aridane, is a Spanish footballer who plays for CA Osasuna as a central defender.

Club career
Born in Tuineje, Las Palmas, Canary Islands, Aridane joined Real Madrid's youth setup in 2006, aged 17, after stints at UD Gran Tarajal and Real Valladolid. On 31 August 2007 he joined Liverpool, but appearing with UD Fuerteventura.

In July 2008 Aridane returned to Valladolid, being assigned to the reserves in Tercera División. He was first summoned to a La Liga match on 23 May 2009, but remained on the bench in a 1–2 home loss against Sporting de Gijón.

On 5 August 2010 Aridane moved to AD Ceuta in Segunda División B; after appearing sparingly he moved to fellow league team Deportivo Alavés roughly a year later. In the 2012 summer he signed for CD Corralejo in the fourth tier, but moved to CD Eldense in the same division on 27 December.

On 9 July 2015, after nearly signing for UE Olot, Aridane signed a two-year deal with La Liga side Granada CF, and was loaned to Cádiz CF also in the third tier on 19 July. After contributing with 33 appearances in the latter's promotion campaign, he signed a permanent three-year deal with the club on 18 July 2016.

Aridane made his professional debut on 19 August 2016, starting in a 1–1 away draw against UD Almería. He scored his first professional goal on 23 October, netting the first in a 2–2 home draw against UCAM Murcia CF.

On 17 July 2017, Aridane signed a four-year contract with fellow second tier club CA Osasuna, for a transfer fee of €1.5 million. In his first season with the new club he played 29 matches in Segunda División, among them 26 as a starter. He also scored one goal in the match against Rayo Vallecano in the Campo de Fútbol de Vallecas when Osasuna won 3:0. It took place on September 10, 2017.

Career statistics

Club

Honours
Osasuna
Segunda División: 2018–19

References

External links

1989 births
Living people
People from Fuerteventura
Sportspeople from the Province of Las Palmas
Spanish footballers
Footballers from the Canary Islands
Association football defenders
La Liga players
Segunda División players
Segunda División B players
Tercera División players
Real Valladolid Promesas players
AD Ceuta footballers
Deportivo Alavés players
CD Eldense footballers
Granada CF footballers
Cádiz CF players
CA Osasuna players